Ferdinand Township is one of twelve townships in Dubois County, Indiana. As of the 2010 census, its population was 3,629 and it contained 1,389 housing units.

Geography
Camp Ground Lake is in this township.

The Ferdinand State Forest and lake is also located in Ferdinand Township.

Cities and towns
 Ferdinand

Adjacent townships
 Jackson Township (north)
 Jefferson Township (northeast)
 Clark Township, Perry County (southeast)
 Harrison Township, Spencer County (south)
 Carter Township, Spencer County (southwest)
 Cass Township (west)
 Patoka Township (northwest)

Major highways
  Interstate 64
  Indiana State Road 162

Cemeteries
The township contains two cemeteries, Pinkston-Hagan Cemetery and St. Ferdinand Catholic Church Cemetery.

References
 
 United States Census Bureau cartographic boundary files

External links
 Indiana Township Association
 United Township Association of Indiana

Townships in Dubois County, Indiana
Jasper, Indiana micropolitan area
Townships in Indiana